A frikadelle is a rounded, flat-bottomed, pan-fried meatball of minced meat, often likened to the German and/or Danish version of meatballs. The origin of the dish is unknown. The term  is German but the dish is associated with German, Scandinavian and Polish cuisines. It is considered a national dish in Denmark.

There are various local variants of frikadelle throughout Scandinavia, as both a main course and a side dish. In Sweden, the word  refers to meatballs that are boiled, not pan-fried.

Etymology
The origin of the word is uncertain. And in Phillips's New World of Words (1706) it is defined as "Fricandoe, a sort of Scotch Collops made of thin slices of Veal, well larded and stuff'd." The Oxford English Dictionary defines fricandele (variation fricadelle) as a "quasi-French form of fricandeau".

Other variations

Denmark 
In Denmark, traditionally, they are made from minced veal, pork or beef (or a blend of two of these meats); chopped onions; eggs; milk (or water); bread crumbs (or oatmeal or flour); salt; and pepper; then formed into balls by using a tablespoon to get the right size  and flattened somewhat. They are then pan-fried in pork fat or beef fat, or more commonly in modern times in butter, margarine or even vegetable oil. Another popular variation is  replacing the meat with fish (mostly cod, but sometimes cod and salmon) as the main ingredient and often served with remoulade.

As a main dish, they are most often served with boiled white potatoes and gravy accompanied by pickled beetroot or cooked red cabbage. Alternatively, they can be served with creamed, white cabbage.

Frikadeller are also eaten on ryebread (rugbrød) with red cabbage or pickle slices as a traditional Danish smørrebrød.

The combination of frikadeller and a cold potato salad is very popular at picnics or potlucks, due to the ease of transporting either component after cooking.

Indonesia 
Frikadel are also known in Indonesian cuisine through Dutch cuisine (of the frikadel, which is historically similar to the frikadaller) influence and called perkedel, however the main ingredient is not meat, but mashed potato, sometimes slightly mixed with ground meat or corned beef.  The mixture is then shaped into flat round patties and dipped in egg yolk before being deep fried. Other than mashed potato, cabe rawit, spring onion, shrimp,  peeled corn, or mashed tofu fritters are also common as perkedel ingredients.

See also

 Frikkadel
 Frikandel
 Faggot (food)
 Hamburg steak
 Hamburger
 Shami kebab
 List of meatball dishes
 Perkedel
 Cuisine of Denmark
 Cuisine of Germany
 Cuisine of Norway
 Salisbury steak
 South African cuisine
 Skilpadjies
 Swedish meatball
 Dry meatballs
 Tteok-galbi

Explanatory notes

References

External links
Frikadeller Recipe in the Wikibooks Cookbook

Danish cuisine
German cuisine
Norwegian cuisine
Meatballs
Polish cuisine
Dutch cuisine
National dishes

fr:Boulette de viande#Europe
ja:ミートボール#各国のミートボール
zh:肉圓#世界各地的肉圓